The Institute of Forestry (IoF) is one of the five technical institutes under Tribhuvan University, Nepal's largest academic institution. Under the Department of Forests, the IoF was founded as Nepal Forestry Institute in 1947 in Singha Durbar. However, it was relocated to Bhimphedi in 1957, then to Hetauda in 1965, before being incorporated into TU from 1972. The current head office of the institute, usually referred to as the dean's office, is housed at Pokhara Campus.

The IoF implements forestry-related academic programs through its two constituent campuses, located in Pokhara and Hetauda.  The current dean of the institute is Bir Bahadur Khanal Chhetri, and he is backed by two assistant deans, presently Jit Narayan Sah and Mahendra Singh Thapa.

See also
The other technical institutes at TU are:
 Institute of Agriculture and Animal Science
 Institute of Engineering
 Institute of Medicine
 Institute of Science and Technology

References

Tribhuvan University
Forestry education
Forestry in Nepal
1947 establishments in Nepal
Educational institutions established in 1947
Science and technology in Nepal